Charlotte Corneliussen is a former women's cricketer for the Denmark national women's cricket team who played two ODIs during the 1989 Women's European Cricket Cup. A wicket-keeper batsman, she scored 15 runs in her two innings, took two catches and two stumpings.

References

Danish women cricketers
Denmark women One Day International cricketers
Living people
Year of birth missing (living people)